Posthodiplostomum is a genus of flatworms belonging to the family Diplostomidae.

The species of this genus are found in Europe, Australia and Northern America.

Species:
 Posthodiplostomum brevicaudatum (von Nordmann, 1832)
 Posthodiplostomum centrarchi

References

Platyhelminthes